Allergy is a monthly peer-reviewed medical journal covering the field of allergy and immunology, that is published by John Wiley & Sons on behalf of the European Academy of Allergology and Clinical Immunology. It publishes both original articles and reviews. The editor-in-chief is Cezmi Akdis (University of Zurich). According to the Journal Citation Reports, the journal has a 2020 impact factor of 13.146.

History

Allergy was founded by Ernst B. Salén as Acta Allergologica and was first published by Einer Munksgard in 1948. Salén was also the original editor-in-chief, however Egon Bruun also helped in the early years. Other editors-in-chief have been Gunnar Bendixen (1970–1992), Gunnar S. Johansson (1993–2002), Jean Bousquet (2003–2009), Thomas Bieber and Hans-Uwe Simon (2010–2017), and the current editor-in-chief Cezmi Akdis (March 2018–present).

References

External links
 

Immunology journals
Wiley (publisher) academic journals
Monthly journals
Publications established in 1948
English-language journals